Ackama is a genus of flowering plants in the family Cunoniaceae, native to Australia (New South Wales, Queensland) and north New Zealand. The genus was first described by Allan Cunningham in 1839.

Species
, Plants of the World Online accepted the following species:
Ackama australiensis (Schltr.) C.T.White
Ackama nubicola de Lange
Ackama paniculosa (F.Muell.) Heslewood
Ackama papuana Pulle
Ackama rosifolia A.Cunn.

References

Cunoniaceae
Oxalidales genera